Springstone Run is a stream in the U.S. state of West Virginia.

Springstone Run most likely was named after Abraham Springstone, an early settler.

See also
List of rivers of West Virginia

References

Rivers of Randolph County, West Virginia
Rivers of West Virginia